The Tupelo Micropolitan Statistical Area is a micropolitan area in northeastern Mississippi that covers three counties—Itawamba, Lee and Pontotoc. As of the 2000 census, the area had a population of 163,398.

Counties
Itawamba
Lee
Pontotoc

Communities

Cities
Baldwyn (partial)
Fulton
Pontotoc
Saltillo
Tupelo (Principal City)
Verona

Towns
Algoma
Ecru
Guntown
Mantachie
Nettleton (partial)
Plantersville
Shannon
Sherman (partial)
Thaxton
Toccopola
Tremont

Unincorporated places
Dorsey
Eggville
Fairview
Mooreville
Randolph 
Springville
Troy

Demographics
As of the census of 2000, there were 125,251 people, 48,070 households, and 34,881 families residing within the μSA. The racial makeup of the μSA was 79.37% White, 18.98% African American, 0.16% Native American, 0.37% Asian, 0.01% Pacific Islander, 0.47% from other races, and 0.64% from two or more races. Hispanic or Latino of any race were 1.27% of the population.

The median income for a household in the μSA was $33,125, and the median income for a family was $39,929. Males had a median income of $29,781 versus $21,495 for females. The per capita income for the μSA was $16,523.

See also
List of metropolitan areas in Mississippi
List of micropolitan areas in Mississippi
List of cities in Mississippi
List of towns and villages in Mississippi
List of census-designated places in Mississippi
List of United States metropolitan areas

References

 
Geography of Itawamba County, Mississippi
Geography of Lee County, Mississippi
Geography of Pontotoc County, Mississippi